Perylene or perilene is a polycyclic aromatic hydrocarbon with the chemical formula C20H12, occurring as a brown solid.  It or its derivatives may be carcinogenic, and it is considered to be a hazardous pollutant.  In cell membrane cytochemistry, perylene is used as a fluorescent lipid probe. It is the parent compound of a class of rylene dyes.

Reactions
Like other polycyclic aromatic compounds, perylene is reduced by alkali metals to give a deeply colored radical anion and a dianion. The diglyme solvates of these salts have been characterized by X-ray crystallography.

Emission
Perylene displays blue fluorescence. It is used as a blue-emitting dopant material in OLEDs, either pure or substituted. Perylene can be also used as an organic photoconductor. It has an absorption maximum at 434 nm, and as with all polycyclic aromatic compounds, low water solubility (1.2 x 10−5 mmol/L). Perylene has a molar absorptivity of 38,500 M−1cm−1 at 435.7 nm.

Structure

The perylene molecule consists of two naphthalene molecules connected by a carbon-carbon bond at the 1 and 8 positions on both molecules.  All of the carbon atoms in perylene are sp2 hybridized. The structure of perylene has been extensively studied by X-ray crystallography.

Biology
Naturally occurring perylene quinones have been identified in lichens Laurera sanguinaria Malme and Graphis haematites Fée.

References

IARC Group 3 carcinogens
Membrane biology
Polycyclic aromatic hydrocarbons
Organic semiconductors
Fluorescent dyes